Melanie Klein (née Reizes; 30 March 1882 – 22 September 1960) was an Austrian-British author and psychoanalyst known for her work in child analysis. She was the primary figure in the development of object relations theory. Klein suggested that pre-verbal existential anxiety in infancy catalyzed the formation of the unconscious, resulting in the unconscious splitting of the world into good and bad idealizations. In her theory, how the child resolves that split depends on the constitution of the child and the character of nurturing the child experiences; the quality of resolution can inform the presence, absence, and/or type of distresses a person experiences later in life.

Life

Melanie Klein was born into a Jewish family and spent most of her early life in Vienna. She was the fourth and final child of parents Moriz, a doctor, and Libussa Reizes. Educated at the Gymnasium, Klein planned to study medicine. Her family's loss of wealth caused her to change her plans.

At the age of 21 she married an industrial chemist, Arthur Klein, and soon after gave birth to their first child, Melitta. Her son Hans followed in 1907 and her second son Erich was born in 1914. While she would go on to bear two additional children, Klein suffered from clinical depression, with these pregnancies taking quite a toll on her. This and her unhappy marriage soon led Klein to seek treatment. Shortly after her family moved to Budapest in 1910, Klein began a course of therapy with psychoanalyst Sándor Ferenczi. It was during their time together that Klein expressed interest in the study of psychoanalysis.

Encouraged by Ferenczi, Klein began her studies by observing her own children. Until this time, only minimal documentation existed on the topic of psychoanalysis in children, Klein took advantage of this by developing her "play technique". Similar to that of free association in adult psychoanalysis, Klein's play technique sought to interpret the unconscious meaning behind the play and interaction of children.

During 1921, with her marriage failing, Klein moved to Berlin where she joined the Berlin Psycho-Analytic Society under the tutelage of Karl Abraham. Although Abraham supported her pioneering work with children, neither Klein nor her ideas received much support in Berlin. As a divorced woman whose academic qualifications did not even include a bachelor's degree, Klein was a visible iconoclast within a profession dominated by male physicians. Nevertheless, Klein's early work had a strong influence on the developing theories and techniques of psychoanalysis, particularly in Great Britain.

Her theories on human development and defense mechanisms were a source of controversy, as they conflicted with Freud's theories on development, and caused much discussion in the world of developmental psychology. Around the same time Klein presented her ideas, Anna Freud was doing the very same. The two became unofficial rivals of sorts, amid the protracted debates between the followers of Klein and the followers of Freud. Amid these so-called 'controversial discussions', the British Psychoanalytical Society split into three separate training divisions: (1) Kleinian, (2) Freudian, and (3) Independent. These debates finally ceased with an agreement on a dual approach to instruction in the field of child analysis.

Contributions to psychoanalysis

Klein was one of the first to use traditional psychoanalysis with young children. She was innovative in both her techniques (such as working with children using toys) and her theories on infant development. Gaining the respect of those in the academic community, Klein established a highly influential training program in psychoanalysis.

By observing and analyzing the play and interactions of children, Klein built onto the work of Freud's unconscious mind. Her dive into the unconscious mind of the infant yielded the findings of the early Oedipus complex, as well as the developmental roots of the superego.

Klein's theoretical work incorporates Freud's belief in the existence of the death pulsation, reflecting the notion that all living organisms are inherently drawn toward an "inorganic" state, and therefore, somehow, towards death. In psychological terms, Eros (properly, the life pulsation), the postulated sustaining and uniting principle of life, is thereby presumed to have a companion force, Thanatos (death pulsation), which seeks to terminate and disintegrate life (although Freud never used the term 'Thanatos' in his own writing). Both Freud and Klein regarded these "biomental" forces as the foundations of the psyche. These primary unconscious forces, whose mental matrix is the id, spark the ego—the experiencing self—into activity. Id, ego and superego, to be sure, were merely shorthand terms (similar to the instincts) referring to highly complex and mostly uncharted psychodynamic operations.

Infant observations 
Klein’s work on the importance of observing infants began in 1935 with a public lecture on weaning.

Klein states that mother–infant relationships are built on more than feeding and developing the infant’s attachment; the mother’s attachment and bond with her baby is just as important, if not more. Klein came to this conclusion by using actual observations of  herself and mothers that she knew. She described how infants show interest in their mothers' face, the touch of their mothers' hands, and the infants' pleasure in touching their mothers' breast. The relationship is built on affection that emerges very soon after birth. Klein says that as early as two months, infants show interest in the mother that goes beyond feeding. She observed that the infant will often smile up at the mother and cuddle against her chest. The way the infant reacts and responds to their mother's attitude and feelings, the love and interest which the infant shows, accounts for an object relation.

Klein also goes on to say that infants recognize the joy that their achievements give their parents. These achievements include crawling and walking. In one observation, Klein says that the infant wishes to evoke love in their mother with their achievements. The infant wishes to give her pleasure. Klein says that the infant notices that their smile makes their mother happy and results in the attention of her. The infant also recognizes that their smile may serve a better purpose than their cry.

Klein also talks about the "apathetic" baby. She says that it is easy to mistake a baby that does not particularly dislike their food and cries a little for a happy baby. Development later shows that some of these easy-going babies are not happy. Their lack of crying may be due to some kind of apathy. It is hard to assess a young person's state of mind without allowing for a great complexity of emotions. When these babies are followed up on we see that a great deal of difficulty appears. These children are often shy of people, and their interest in the external world, play, and learning is inhibited. They are often slow at learning to crawl and walk because there seems to be little incentive. They are often showing signs of neurosis as their development goes on.

Child analysis 
While Freud's ideas concerning children mostly came from working with adult patients, Klein was innovative in working directly with children, often as young as two years old. Klein saw children's play as their primary mode of emotional communication. While observing children as they played with toys such as dolls, animals, plasticine or pencils and paper, Klein documented their activities and interactions. She then attempted to interpret the unconscious meaning behind their play. Following Freud, she emphasized the significant role that parental figures played in the child's fantasy life and concluded that the timing of Freud's Oedipus complex was incorrect. Contradicting Freud, she proposed that the superego was present from birth.

After exploring ultra-aggressive fantasies of hate, envy, and greed in very young and disturbed children, Melanie Klein proposed a model of the human psyche that linked significant oscillations of state, with the postulated Eros or Thanatos pulsations. She named the state of the mind in which the sustaining principle of life dominates the depressive position. A depressive position is the understanding that good and evil things are one. The fears and worries about the fate of the people destroyed in the child's fantasy are all in the latter. The child tries to repair his mother through phantasm and behavior therapy, overcoming his depression and anxiety. He employs phantasies representing love and restoration to restore the others he destroyed. Morality is based on the standpoint of depression. Klein named it the depressive position because the efforts to restore the integrity of the damaged object are accompanied by depression and despair. After all, the child doubts whether it can fix everything it hurts. Many consider this to be her most significant contribution to psychoanalytic philosophy. She later developed her ideas about an earlier developmental psychological state corresponding to the disintegrating tendency of life, which she called the paranoid-schizoid position.
Klein coined the term "paranoid-schizoid defense" to emphasize how the child's worries manifest as persecution fantasies and how he defends himself against persecution by separating. The paranoid-schizoid position develops at birth is a common psychotic condition.

Klein's insistence on regarding aggression as an important force in its own right when analyzing children brought her into conflict with Freud's daughter Anna Freud, who was one of the other prominent child psychotherapists in continental Europe but who moved to London in 1938 where Klein had been working for several years. Many controversies arose from this conflict, and these are often referred to as the controversial discussions. Battles were played out between the two sides, each presenting scientific papers, working out their respective positions and where they differed, during war-time Britain. A compromise was eventually reached whereby three distinct training groups were formed within the British Psychoanalytical Society, with Anna Freud's influence remaining largely predominant in the US

Object relation theory 

Klein is known to be one of the primary founders of object relations theory. This theory of psychoanalysis is based on the assumption that all individuals have within them an internalized, and primarily unconscious realm of relationships. These relationships refer not only to the world around the individual, but more specifically to other individuals surrounding the subject. Object relation theory focuses primarily on the interaction individuals have with others, how those interactions are internalized, and how these now internalized object relations affect one's psychological framework. The term "object" refers to the potential embodiment of fear, desire, envy or other comparable emotions. The object and the subject are separated, allowing for a more simplistic approach to addressing the deprived areas of need when used in the clinical setting.

Klein’s approach differed from Anna Freud's ego-psychology approach. Klein explored the interpersonal aspect of the structural model. In the mid-1920s, she thought differently about the first mode of defense. Klein thought it was expulsion while Freud speculated it was repression (Stein, 1990). Klein suggested that the infant could relate - from birth - to its mother, who was deemed either “good” or “bad” and internalized as archaic part-object, thereby developing a phantasy life in the infant. Because of this supposition, Klein’s beliefs required her to proclaim that an ego exists from birth, enabling the infant to relate to others early in life (Likierman & Urban, 1999).

Influence on feminism
In Dorothy Dinnerstein’s book The Mermaid and the Minotaur (1976) (also published in the UK as The Rocking of the Cradle and the Ruling of the World), drawing from elements of Sigmund Freud’s psychoanalysis, particularly as developed by Klein, Dinnerstein argued that sexism and aggression are both inevitable consequences of child rearing being left exclusively to women. As a solution, Dinnerstein proposed that men and women equally share infant and child care responsibilities. This book became a classic of U.S. second-wave feminism and was later translated into seven languages.

Feminists critical of Klein’s work have drawn attention to an unwarranted assumption of a natural causality connecting sex, gender and desire, stereotypical gender descriptions and in general a prescriptive normative privileging of heterosexual dynamics.

In popular culture
 Melanie Klein was the subject of a 1988 play by Nicholas Wright, entitled Mrs. Klein. Set in London in 1934, the play involves a conflict between Melanie Klein and her daughter Melitta Schmideberg, after the death of Melanie's son Hans Klein. The depiction of Melanie Klein is quite unfavorable: the play suggests that Hans' death was a suicide and also reveals that Klein had analysed these two children. In the original production at the Cottesloe Theatre in London, Gillian Barge played Melanie Klein, with Zoë Wanamaker and Francesca Annis playing the supporting roles. In the 1995 New York revival of the play, Melanie Klein was played by Uta Hagen, who described Melanie Klein as a role that she was meant to play. The play was broadcast on the British radio station BBC 4 in 2008 and revived at the Almeida Theatre in London in October 2009 with Clare Higgins as Melanie Klein.
 The indie band Volcano Suns dedicated their first record "The Bright Orange Years" to Klein for her work on childhood aggression.
 Scottish author Alexander McCall Smith makes extensive use of Melanie Klein and her theories in his 44 Scotland Street series. One of the characters, Irene, has an obsession with Kleinian theory, and uses it to "guide" her in the upbringing of her son, Bertie.

Bibliography
Melanie Klein's works are collected in four volumes:
 The Collected Writings of Melanie Klein
 Volume 1 – Love, Guilt and Reparation: And Other Works 1921–1945, London: Hogarth Press.
 Volume 2 – The Psychoanalysis of Children, London: Hogarth Press.
 Volume 3 – Envy and Gratitude, London: Hogarth Press.
 Volume 4 – Narrative of a Child Analysis, London: Hogarth Press.

Books on Melanie Klein:* 
 
 Robert Hinshelwood, Susan Robinson, Oscar Zarate, Introducing Melanie Klein, Icon Books UK 2003
 Robert Hinshelwood, A Dictionary of Kleinian Thought, Free Association Books UK 1989
 Robert Hinshelwood, Clinical Klein, Free Association Books UK 1993
 Melanie Klein, 'The autobiography of Melanie Klein' ed. Janet Sayers with John Forrester, Psychoanalysis and History 15.2 (2013) pp. 127–63
 Mary L Jacobus, "The Poetics of Psychoanalysis: In the Wake of Klein", Oxford University Press, 2006, 
 Julia Kristeva, Melanie Klein (European Perspectives: A Series in Social Thought and Cultural Criticism) tr. Ross Guberman, Columbia University Press, 2004
 Donald Meltzer (Information in French) "The Kleinian Development (New edition)", Publisher: Karnac Books; Reprint edition 1998, 
 Donald Meltzer : "Dream-Life: A Re-Examination of the Psycho-Analytical Theory and Technique"  Publisher: Karnac Books, 1983, 
 Meira Likierman, "Melanie Klein, Her Work in Context" Continuum International, Paperback, 2002
 Hanna Segal (Information in French):
 "Klein" Publisher: Karnac Books; Reprint edition (1989) 
 "The Work of Hanna Segal: A Kleinian Approach to Clinical Practice (Classical Psychoanalysis and Its Applications) " Publisher: Jason Aronson, 1993), 
 "Dream, Phantasy and Art" Publisher: Routledge; 1 edition 1990, 
 Transcript of a seminar titled "Motivation: the artist and the psychoanalyst"
 John Steiner (Information in French) : "Psychic Retreats" (...) relative peace and protection from strain when meaningful contact with the analyst is experienced as(...), Publisher: Routledge; 1993, 
 C. Fred Alford, Melanie Klein and Critical Social Theory: An Account of Politics, Art, and Reason Based on Her Psychoanalytic Theory, Yale UP 1990
 
 Herbert Rosenfeld (Information in French): * "Impasse and Interpretation: Therapeutic and Anti-Therapeutic Factors in the Psycho-Analytic Treatment of Psychotic, Borderline, and Neurotic Patients", Publisher: Tavistock Publications, 1987, 
 Julia Segal: (1992). Melanie Klein. London: Sage. 
 Ronald Britton: "Sex, Death, and the Superego: Experiences in Psychoanalysis", Publisher: Karnac Books; 2003, 
 Ronald Britton: "Belief and Imagination", Publisher: Taylor & Francis LTD; 1998, 
 Monique Lauret et Jean-Philippe Raynaud, "Melanie Klein, une pensée vivante", Presses Universitaires de France, 2008,

See also

References

Further reading
 Phyllis Grosskurth, Melanie Klein: Her World and Her Work, Alfred A. Knopf, Inc., 1986, 
 Rustin, Margaret; Rustin, Michael (2016). Reading Klein - New Library of Psychoanalysis Teaching Series. Routledge, United Kingdom. .

External links 

 
 
 The personal papers of Melanie Klein are available for study at the Wellcome Collection.
 Melanie Klein in the Encyclopædia Britannica
 Biography, psychoanalytic techniques, theory
 Melanie Klein Trust
 Biography at FeministVoices.com

1882 births
1960 deaths
Psychoanalysts from Vienna
Jewish scientists
Jewish psychoanalysts
Austrian Jews
Austro-Hungarian Jews
Austrian emigrants to the United Kingdom
British psychoanalysts
Epistemologists
Transdisciplinarity
20th-century psychologists
Motivation theorists
Positive psychologists
Child development
Developmental psychologists
Stage theories
Freudians
Analysands of Karl Abraham
Analysands of Sándor Ferenczi
Object relations theorists
20th-century Austrian writers
20th-century women writers
History of mental health in the United Kingdom